Microstilifer is a genus of small salt marsh or mudflat snails, marine gastropod mollusks in an unassigned family in the superfamily Cerithioidea.

Species
Species within the genus Microstilifer include:
 Microstilifer auricula (Hedley, 1907)
 † Microstilifer marsanensis Lozouet, 1998

References

 Warén, A. (1980). Descriptions of new taxa of Eulimidae (Mollusca, Prosobranchia), with notes on some previously described genera. Zoologica Scripta. 9: 283-306

External links
 

 Cerithioidea
Gastropod genera